From Now On is the debut studio album by English recording artist Will Young. It was released by S Records on 7 October 2002, eight months after he won the first series of Pop Idol. The singer worked with a variety of writers and producers on the album, including Absolute, Cathy Dennis, Julian Gallagher, Stephen Lipson, Mike Peden, and Richard Stannard as well as Swedish musicians such as Jörgen Elofsson, David Kreuger, and Per Magnusson. Young co-wrote five songs on From Now On which also features a cover version of The Beatles' song "The Long and Winding Road," a duet with fellow Pop Idol finalist Gareth Gates.

The album debuted at number one on the UK Albums Chart, while peaking at number 11 eleven in Ireland and reaching the top thirty in Ireland and the Netherlands. It became the 18th biggest-selling of 2002 in the United Kingdom and has gone on to sell over 880,000 copies. From Now On spawned six singles, including double A-single "Anything Is Possible"/"Evergreen," United Kingdom's highest-selling single of the decade. Follow-up singles "Light My Fire" and "The Long and Winding Road" also fared well, both becoming chart toppers on the UK Singles Chart, while "Don't Let Me Down"/"You and I" peaked at number two. In 2003, the album won Young a BRIT Award for Best Breakthrough Artist, while "Evergreen" received a nomination in the Song of the Year category and "Anything Is Possible" was awarded the Ivor Novello Award for Bestselling Song of 2002.

Promotion
From Now On was preceded by its double A-lead single, consisting of a cover version of Irish boy band Westlife's 2001 song "Evergreen" and "Anything Is Possible," a new song written for the winner of Pop Idol by Chris Braide and Cathy Dennis. In March 2002, this became the fastest-selling debut in UK chart history, selling 403,027 copies on its day of release (1,108,659 copies in its first week). It went on to sell over 1.7 million copies, and on the official list of the all-time best-selling singles in the UK issued later that year, it was ranked eleventh. In 2008, Official Charts Company released the Top 40 Biggest Selling Singles of the 21st century (so far) in which Young's version of "Evergreen" topped the chart. On 31 December 2009, BBC Radio 1 confirmed that "Anything Is Possible"/"Evergreen" was the biggest selling single of the 2000s decade in the United Kingdom. This was again confirmed on 7 May 2012 when Radio 1 played a countdown of the top-selling 150 songs of the millennium so far. 

"Light My Fire," a cover version of American rock band The Doors 1967 hit single, recorded in the style of Puerto Rican singer José Feliciano's version (1968), was released as the album's second single, having previously been performed as a piano version in the final 50 of Pop Idol, and again, with a backing track, in the final 10. The song went straight to the number one spot in the UK Singles Chart, selling 177,000 copies in its first week of release, and stayed at number one for two weeks. Also serving as Young's international debut, it became a top ten hit in Ireland, and, Italy. A cover version of The Beatles's "The Long and Winding Road" 1970), a duet with fellow Pop Idol contestant Gareth Gates, was released as a double A-side (with Gates's song "Suspicious Minds") and became Young's third consecutive number-one hit in the United Kingdom. The album's final single, another double A-side, consisting of "Don't Let Me Down" and "You and I," was released in aid of Children in Need, and reached the top five in the Netherlands and the United Kingdom.

Critical reception

Julie Broadfoot from BBC Music wrote that Young "got on with making an impressive, timeless, debut album [...] A quality cast have been picked. However, this album is not paint-by-numbers pop; the legendary Burt Bacharach has got involved, acting as the perfect accompaniment to Will's vocal talent." Broadfoot singled "Lovestruck" out for praise, calling From Now On an "impressive, timeless, debut album" and "a fab album that won't disappoint anyone." Michael Osborn of musicOMH noted "This debut offering seems to have struck a balance between making the best of Will Young’s particular talents – and the musical niche where he excels. It should go some way towards silencing critics [...]", although he felt Young appeared nit "entirely comfortable with [...] sweet, candied pop." Allmusic editor Jon O'Brien found that "Young proved himself to be one of the most gifted and unique vocalists a U.K. talent show has seen" but called From Now On "an inconsistent effort." He disliked the singles, but added that the album has "a well-produced and well-crafted collection of mature pop songs that suggests Young will have no problem breaking free from his Pop Idol tag in the future." 

RTÉ critic David Byrne found that "what this album needs is less humming and strumming, and more of the intensity evident in "Fine Line" and "Side By Side". The music is well-produced, but it just doesn't seem to fit Will. It would be great to see him rock-out Avril Lavigne-style, up-tempo à la Kylie or even salsa like Ricky Martin, but that might be expecting a bit much. A little loosening-up perhaps? Will is far too young for sipping cocktails with Burt [Bacharach]." Alexis Petridis, writing for The Guardian, felt that "Young does not exist as an artist in his own right [...] You wouldn't wish him sleepless nights. He really does seem like a nice enough bloke. But after hearing From Now On, you wish this wretched business would stop, and stop soon." In a retrospective review, Pop Rescue gave the album four stars of five rating, commenting they were "somewhat surprised by how good this album is. As predicted, it throws in some pent-up S Club pop that must have been originally intended for judge’s favourite Gareth Gates’ anticipated win, but the sum of the greatness of the other songs out-weighs this". The writer praising Young's vocals throughout the album and numbers such as "Light My Fire", "Lovestruck", "Fine Line" and "What's in a Goodbye", among others.

Commercial performance
From Now On debuted at number one on the UK Albums Chart in the week ending 19 October 2002, having sold 187,350 copies in its first week of sales. The Official Charts Company ranked it 18th on its 2002 year-end chart. The album was certified platinum by the British Phonographic Industry (BPI) on 18 October 2002, and reached double platinum status on 15 November 2002. By 2015, From Now On had sold just over 880,000 copies.

Track listing

Notes
 signifies a co-producer

Personnel

Will Young – vocals
Per Magnusson – keyboards
Pete Murray – keyboards
Peter Gordeno – keyboards, piano, Fender Rhodes
Simon Hale – keyboards
Esbörn Öhrwall – guitar
Fridrik 'Frizzy' Karlsson – guitar
Milton McDonald – guitar
Fabien Waltmann – guitar, bass guitar
Graham Kearns – guitar
Anthony Drennan – guitar
Dave Morgan – guitar
Steve Lewinson – bass guitar
Paul Turner – bass guitar
Jack Daley – bass guitar
Tomas Lindburg – bass guitar
Jeremy Stacey – drums
Richard 'Biff' Stannard – drums, backing vocals
Julian Gallagher – drums
Karlos Edwards – percussion
Thomas Dyani – percussion
Karen Street – accordion
The London Sessions Orchestra – strings
Stockholm Session Orchestra - strings
Absolute – instruments on "Light My Fire"
Anders von Hofsten – backing vocals
Jeanette Olsson – backing vocals
United Colours of Sound – backing vocals
Lance Ellington – backing vocals
Silvia Mason-James – backing vocals
Cathy Dennis – backing vocals
Tee Green – backing vocals
Ed Johnson – backing vocals
Lucie Silvas – backing vocals
Sharon Murphy – backing vocals
London Community Gospel Choir – gospel choir
Per Magnusson – producer, arrangement
David Kreuger – producer, arrangement, programming
Cathy Dennis – producer, programmer
Oskar Paul – producer, programmer
Absolute – producer
Mike Peden – producer
Fabian Waltmann – producer, arrangement, additional drum programming, engineer
Stephen Lipson – producer
Richard 'Biff' Stannard – producer
Julian Gallagher – producer, programmer
Jörgen Elofsson – co-producer
Bernard Löhr – mixer
Adrian Bushby – mixer
Steve Fitzmaurice – mixer
Brad Gilderman – mixer
Phillipe Rose – assistant mixer
Jimmy Robertson – assistant mixer
Peter Lewis – engineer
Adam Brown – engineer
Matt Ross – engineer
Jeremy Stacey – engineer
Heff Moraes – engineer, mixer
Geoff Foster – engineer
Tim Roe – assistant engineer
Fredrik Anderson – orchestra engineer
Ulf and Henrik Janson – orchestra arrangement and conduction
Nick Ingram – string arranger, conductor
Gavyn Wright – orchestra leader
Isobel Griffiths Ltd – orchestra contractor
Martin Hayles – recording engineer
Charlie Russell – programmer
Alvin Sweeney – recorder, mixer, programmer
Paul J. Brady – assistant recorder, assistant mixer

Charts

Weekly charts

Year-end charts

Certifications

Release history

References

2002 debut albums
Will Young albums
Albums produced by Stephen Lipson
19 Recordings albums
Albums produced by Richard Stannard (songwriter)
Albums produced by Mike Peden